Saints Row is a 2006 action-adventure video game developed by Volition and published by THQ for the Xbox 360.  It was released in North America on August 29, 2006, followed by an Australian release two days later and a European release on September 1, 2006 (the same day the mobile version was also released). Set within the fictional city of Stilwater (modeled after Chicago, Detroit, Cleveland, and Baltimore), the single-player story follows a player-created character who joins the 3rd Street Saints gang after they save his life, and helps them rise to prominence by undermining enemy criminal syndicates, while slowly building up his own reputation within the gang. The storyline is non-linear, and divided into three separate story arcs for each rival gang that the player must defeat.

Story missions are unlocked by trading in "Respect" points, currency earned by completing minigames and side-missions. Outside of the main story, players can freely roam Stilwater, consisting of two main islands. The game is played from a third-person perspective and its world is navigated on-foot or by vehicle. Players can fight enemies using a variety of firearms, and call in non-playable gang members to assist them. An online multiplayer mode allows multiple players to engage in a variety of cooperative and competitive game modes.

Saints Row received generally positive reviews upon release, with many critics favorably comparing it to the Grand Theft Auto series. It also did well financially, selling over 1 million copies by the end of 2006. The game's success launched the Saints Row franchise, starting with Saints Row 2 in October 2008.

Gameplay
At the beginning of the game, players create their character through a system that allows them to customize his ethnicity, fitness, face and hairstyle. After completing the first mission, players are then given free roam over the game's open world, the fictional city of Stilwater, which is modeled after Baltimore, Detroit, and Chicago. The game makes use of third-person view, which allows players to freely rotate the camera around their character. Players can run, jump, swim or utilize cars to navigate the world. They may also access the character customization system again at a plastic surgeon to apply cosmetic changes to their character. They can further alter the appearance of their character at clothing stores, tattoo parlors, barbers and jewelers, and tune vehicles at chop shops. A personal garage can be used to store customized vehicles, and vehicles that have been destroyed or lost can be redeemed for a cash fee.

In the bar introductory and epilogue mission sequences, missions in Saints Row are divided between three linear story arcs which can be progressed through simultaneously or one by one, each with the objective of extinguishing a rival gang. Players engage in these missions at their leisure, but a prerequisite to instigate a mission is that they have filled up a bar on their Respect meter to allow them to unlock and play it. Respect is a currency earned by completing activities, which are mini-games that are scattered across the world and have increasing levels of difficulty. Missions and activities also accrue a player's cash income, which can be spent on goods and services such as weapons and clothes. Should players fail a mission, they may instantly reattempt it without incurring a loss of their Respect points. Cinemas scattered throughout the game world allow players to replay missions an unlimited number of times.

Players use hand-to-hand combat, melee weapons, firearms, and explosives to fight rival gangs and the police. A free aiming reticule appears on the screen while players have weapons equipped. Weapons are accessed by a "weapon wheel" inventory system that appears on the screen as players hold down a button. Each of the eight slots on the wheel corresponds to different types of weapons, such as submachine guns and pistols. Players may only carry one of each type of weapon at a time. Saints Row makes use of regenerative health, but this process can be accelerated by eating fast food items.

A "wanted level" system governs the response by opposing forces to players' aggressive actions. In the head-up display, surrounding the minimap, there are two bars; the topmost bar represents rival gangs and the bottommost bar represents the police. As players incite opposing forces, the corresponding bar fills up. Each bar filled is represented by the provoked enemy's logo, be it a star to represent the police or a "gang sign" to represent an enemy gang. One bar of notoriety will result in non-lethal retaliation. However, two, three, four or five bars of notoriety will result in a gradually increased lethal response. Notoriety depletes over time, but enemies will continue to be aggressive towards players until the meter recedes. Players may remove their notoriety instantly by utilizing drive-through confessional booths, visiting plastic surgeons, or inputting cheat codes. If arrested by the police, players will reappear outside a police station with a small bounty collected from their earnings.

Player progression through the game directly affects the presence of their friendly gang, the 3rd Street Saints. The game world is subdivided between districts, such as the Red Light or Downtown districts, each comprising several neighborhoods. Each neighborhood is controlled by a rival gang, but as players complete missions the 3rd Street Saints will take over neighborhoods, causing street members of the gang to spawn there. The pause menu displays a large map of the game world, which allows players to view a graphical representation of the streetscape, and a color filter over each of the neighborhoods represents the gang whom control that neighborhood (purple for the Saints, yellow for the Kings, red for the Carnales and blue for the Rollerz). Saints Row features an in-game GPS navigation device, which allows players to set waypoints with a directional line indicating the quickest route to the marked destination. Players may enlist allied forces, referred to as homies, to aid in combat. Street members of the 3rd Street Saints may be summoned, or players may call up unique homies on their in-game mobile phones. Players can further utilize their mobile phone to contact services such as taxicabs, contact other numbers scattered throughout the map on billboards, or input cheat codes.

Plot
Saints Row opens in 2006, as Stilwater suffers from gang warfare at the hands of three distinct criminal syndicates: the Vice Kings, an African American gang that primarily earns revenue from strip clubs, brothels and record labels; Los Carnales, a Hispanic drug cartel that dominates the narcotics trade and gun-running; and the Westside Rollerz, a gang consisting of Caucasian and Asian members who operate on the lucrative underground racing club. The player character, a random bystander, becomes caught in a crossfire between the three while walking through the streets of the Saint's Row district but is saved by Troy Bradshaw (Michael Rapaport), a member of a smaller multiracial gang called the 3rd Street Saints. Owing to the increasing violence, Saints leader Julius Little (Keith David) initiates the player into the gang and has them reclaim Saint's Row from their rivals, before assigning them to work under his top lieutenants, Dexter "Dex" Jackson (JAQ), Johnny Gat (Daniel Dae Kim), and Lin (Tia Carrere), in wiping out each rival gang.

Gat focuses on hitting operations owned by the Vice Kings, including faking the death of their key asset - Gat's girlfriend and popular R&B singer Aisha (Sy Smith) - which culminate in the gang's leader, Benjamin King (Michael Clarke Duncan), being betrayed by his closest associates for refusing to respond to the Saints' actions. After Julius has him rescued, Benjamin agrees to retire his gang in exchange for the Saints' help in killing his traitorous successor: former Vice Kings madam Tanya Winters (Mila Kunis). Meanwhile, Dex focuses on the Carnales by having the player help the Saints take over their drug operations, and ultimately eliminate their leaders, brothers Hector (Joaquim de Almeida) and Angelo Lopez (Freddy Rodriguez), while also securing a deal with the gang's chief Colombian supplier, Manuel Orejuela (Carlos Ferro). Concurrently, Lin works undercover amongst the Rollerz, eventually learning that the gang is led by street racer Joseph Price (Gregory Sims) and his uncle, wealthy private attorney William Sharp (David Carradine). The player helps Lin earn Price's trust, but Sharp eventually deduces that Lin is a mole and attempts to have her and the player killed. Lin does not survive the encounter, so the player exacts revenge by killing Sharp and Price.

With the city firmly under the control of the Saints, Julius rewards the player for their efforts by naming them his chief lieutenant. Shortly thereafter, however, Stilwater's corrupt police chief, Richard Monroe, has Julius arrested and forces the player to assassinate the city's mayor for his opponent, Alderman Richard Hughes (Clancy Brown), under the threat of having Julius killed in prison. The player complies, but Monroe refuses to release Julius, leading the Saints to ambush Monroe's motorcade, killing him and rescuing Julius. After winning the mayoral election, Hughes invites the player to his private yacht, where he reveals his intentions to have the Saints arrested and Saint's Row sold to private developers after being razed. Meanwhile, Troy is revealed to have been an undercover cop working to dismantle the Saints, and Julius watches the yacht from a distance, having placed hidden explosives on it. As Julius leaves, the yacht is destroyed in an explosion, seemingly killing everyone onboard.

As the end credits roll, Jack Armstrong (David H. Lawrence XVII) and Jane Valderamma (Lauri Hendler) give one final newscast about the recent events in Stilwater, leading into the events of Saints Row 2.

Development
Volition began work on Saints Row in 2003, as a PlayStation 2 game under the title Bling Bling.

Earlier unveiling a beta build of a Wii port was handled by Mass Media, Inc.

The design philosophy behind Saints Rows arcing mission structure was to provide players with more freedom in how they interact with the open world. By developing three story arcs, the team wanted to provide a nonlinear approach by allowing players to progress through the story at their leisure. Adhering to such a design philosophy created a challenge for the team, as they had to balance the open-ended nature of the mission structure with a story progression that felt natural and player-engaging. "Stories, by definition, are fairly linear, so the two goals conflicted with each other", design director Christopher Stockman opined.

During development, the team turned to earlier open world games to establish principles for innovation, adopting the design philosophy "everything matters". The team wanted to synthesise game mechanics together to make the missions, activities and customization options work in tandem. Stockman felt that previous open world games did not reward players for experimenting with the sandbox enough because story progression was siphoned off from free roam gameplay. From this sentiment, the concept of the activities developed; players in Saints Row would be encouraged into off-mission content because progression through activities would unlock more story missions. The team would conduct review meetings to assess how the activities developed and whether or not refinements would need to be made. Some activities went through larger design changes than others; in an earlier inception of Drug Trafficking, players would have driven around the city providing addicts with narcotics while under the pressure of a time limit. Concurrently, the team were making refinements to defensive sequences in the story missions, which influenced the final revision of the Drug Trafficking activity.

Developing the city Stilwater required scaling back revisions to appropriate for a play space that could be comfortably traversed. During early production the team rendered an elementary model of the city in the engine, and drove around in the model to get a sense of the city's scale. They found the revision too small, so they quadrupled its dimensions, but soon had to scale it back to a more manageable size. Having found an appropriate size, the team began working on the city in detail, adding in transportation networks and buildings. The team made further revisions during this process as necessary, balancing the number of interior models like shops and mission-related buildings in each district so that no one section of the city would feel denser than another. Some districts planned for the city, such as an indoor shopping mall, a train station, and a trailer park, were cut during development and were added in Saints Row 2.

Soundtrack
The soundtrack of Saints Row includes over 130 musical tracks covering the classical, easy listening, drum and bass/breakbeat, metal, reggae, rock, R&B and hip hop genres. The music is presented by 12 radio stations, and there is an in-game music player accessible through the pause menu. The player purchases songs for the music player at the record store franchise "Scratch That Music" in Stilwater using in-game money.

Downloadable content
Several packages of downloadable content (DLC) have been released. The DLCs are as follows:

Funky Fresh Pack - players get over sixty exclusive clothing and accessory options
Industrial Map Pack - players get a new map for use in competitive multiplayer modes
Ho Ho Ho Pack - players get Christmas-themed costumes and hair styles
Gankster Pack - players get two exclusive vehicles and a co-op mission
Exclusive Unkut Pack - players get access to Unkut-themed outfits and tattoos

As of 2013, those DLCs are no longer available on the Xbox Live network. They were re-introduced on July 29, 2015.

Sequels

Reception
Prior to the retail version of Saints Row being released, the demo set an Xbox Live Marketplace then-record for being downloaded more than 350,000 times in the first week of its release.

The game received "favorable" reviews according to the review aggregation website Metacritic. Reviewers likened Saints Row to the Grand Theft Auto series; some felt the game improved upon the gameplay of Grand Theft Auto, but others criticized the game's lack of originality. Steven Embling of play.tm wrote that while the game "isn't going to win any awards for originality", the game's graphics and sound design were "impressive" and "highly commendable". Ryan McCaffrey of GamesRadar+ considered the game a worthy entry into a genre beholden to Grand Theft Auto, praising the game's graphics and use of the Havok engine, but lamenting the Respect system for disrupting story progression. Will Tuttle of GameSpy considered that while not all players would respond positively to the Respect system necessitating mission progression, the Activities "offer some of the game's most memorable sequences". Scott Sharkey of 1UP.com noted that Saints Row removed frustrating elements from previous Grand Theft Auto games, like load times between city sections and combat reliant on auto-aim, but considered its attempts to recreate urban gang culture and satire "so hackneyed that they cast an embarrassing shadow over the whole thing". In Japan, where the game was ported for release on June 21, 2007, Famitsu gave it a score of one nine, two eights, and one nine for a total of 34 out of 40.

Detroit Free Press gave the game a score of a full four stars and said it was "the deepest and most exciting to date of all the freewheeling street shooter games. There are missions and activities galore." The Times similarly gave it a full five stars and said, "This is a game guaranteed to offend and entertain in equal measure, but it is emphatically not for children." The Sydney Morning Herald gave it four stars out of five and said that the game "lacks the clever subtlety and fun-loving sense of mischief of Grand Theft Auto, with much of its humour falling flat. But there's plenty of fun to be had while waiting for the real deal (GTA IV) to be released in October next year." 411Mania gave it a score of 7.5 out of 10 and said it was "as addictive and guilty-as-sin fun as the game it imitates, and this is one case where imitation is the best form of flattery." The A.V. Club similarly gave it a B and called it "the perfect thug sim for your younger siblings."

Saints Row received awards from GameSpot for "Most Surprisingly Good Game of 2006", as well as Gaming Target for one of 52 Games We will Still Be Playing From 2006 selection. Saints Row sold over 2 million copies, and has since joined the Xbox 360 lineup of "Platinum Hits" games.

References

External links
 
 
 

2006 video games
Cancelled PlayStation 2 games
Cancelled PlayStation 3 games
Cancelled Wii games
Mobile games
Multiplayer and single-player video games
Organized crime video games
Saints Row
THQ games
Video games with downloadable content
Xbox 360 games
Xbox 360-only games
Video games set in 2006
Open-world video games
Video games about the illegal drug trade
Video games using Havok
Video games set in the United States
Video games with custom soundtrack support
Video games developed in the United States